The British Orienteering Championships are the highest level of competition in Orienteering in the United Kingdom, along with the JK Orienteering Festival.

1967 saw the first British Championships, held in Hamsterley Forest. Since then, 4 further disciplines have emerged: the Relay, Night, Middle and Sprint Championships.

Race Venues

Men's Champions
Note 1: Courses cancelled due to an outbreak of foot and mouth disease.
Note 2: Courses voided due to unfair advantage.
Note 3: Courses cancelled due to COVID-19.

Women's Champions

References

Orienteering in the United Kingdom
Orienteering competitions